Louis Edward Satterfield (April 3, 1937 – September 27, 2004) was an American bassist and trombonist. Satterfield was a member of both The Pharaohs and the Phenix Horns. He also collaborated with prominent artists such as Earth, Wind & Fire, Muddy Waters, Phil Collins, B.B King, The Emotions, Ramsey Lewis, The Whispers and The Gap Band.

Biography and career
Satterfield was born in Shaw, Mississippi, a city in Bolivar and Sunflower counties, Mississippi, in the Mississippi Delta region, on April 3, 1937.

In the late 1950s–early 1960s, Satterfield, Charles Handy on trumpet, and Don Myrick on alto saxophone formed The Jazzmen, a student jazz trio at Crane Junior College in Chicago, Illinois. They were backed by Fred Humphrey on piano, Ernest McCarthy on bass guitar, and Maurice White on drums. Satterfield as a session bassist, White, and Handy were studio musicians at Chess Records in Chicago. Satterfield most memorable contribution being the bassline to Fontella Bass's "Rescue Me" with White on drums. The Jazzmen collaborations and live concerts with Philip Cohran and the Artistic Heritage Ensemble at the Affro Arts Theater on the south side of Chicago went on to form The Pharaohs. In 1971, the band recorded its first and only studio album The Awakening, and in 1972 In the Basement, an album reissued by Luv N' Haight in November 1996 that features four tracks recorded live at High Chaparral in Chicago, a track from the original master tapes for The Awakening album, and "Love and Happiness", which was the B-side of "Freedom Road" single for Scarab Records. After leaving an early incarnation of the Pharaohs to play in the Ramsey Lewis Trio, White went on to start the band Earth, Wind & Fire.
While at Chess Records, Satterfield was also teacher to up and coming electric bassists, most notably, White's younger brother Verdine White.

The inception of the Phenix Horns, as the main horn section for Earth, Wind & Fire, originally known as the EWF Horns, came about in 1975 when White expanded the band's timbral palette to include more horns. At first the horn section included Satterfield and his bandmate from The Pharaohs, saxophonist Don Myrick along with lead trumpet player Michael Harris. They started touring with the band in 1975 and played on all EWF albums from 1975 until 1983. Satterfield and Earth, Wind & Fire bass player and Maurice White's younger brother Verdine White wrote a book, Playing the Bass Guitar, first published by Almo in 1978. 1979 saw the arrival of trumpeter Rahmlee Michael Davis for the recording of the album I Am. In 1981, the foursome joined Genesis drummer Phil Collins and producer Hugh Padgham in the studio for the recording of Collins's debut solo album, Face Value. Five of the musically diverse album's 12 tracks featured horns, with a sixth, a rendition of the Beatles' "Tomorrow Never Knows", featuring electronically manipulated samples of the section. The group's extreme precision was put to good use in up-tempo numbers like "Behind the Lines" and the mostly instrumental "Hand in Hand". The section also joined Collins's band Genesis on the song "No Reply at All" on their album Abacab, as well as on "Paperlate", a song from the band's EP 3×3, which was also included on the U.S. release of the album Three Sides Live.

The foursome developed a strong kinship with Collins and elected to join him on tour and for the recording of subsequent albums, while still performing and recording with EWF intermittently. Early concert footage shows the section doing considerably more than playing their instruments by singing and playing percussion on virtually every song that does not feature horns. During the extended intro to "Hand in Hand", the foursome join Collins at the front of the stage for a vocal call and response. Satterfield played baritone saxophone to brighten the section's sound for certain parts. Following the 1985–1986 tour, Michael Harris departed the group and was replaced by Harry Kim, and the horn section saw a diminished role in Collin's live shows. Following the 1990 live album and video Serious Hits... Live! Don Myrick also departed, largely due to continued struggles with drug addiction. Myrick was shot to death by a Santa Monica Police Department officer in the doorway of his home in 1993. He was replaced by erstwhile EWF co-saxophonist Andrew Woolfolk. By the time of the recording of 1996's Dance into the Light, the Phenix Horns had dissolved. They were replaced by the Vine Street Horns, featuring Phenix Horns replacements Woolfolk and Harry Kim along with 2nd trumpet Daniel Fornero, and trombonist Arturo Velasco.

Louis Satterfield performed until his death on September 27, 2004 in Chicago. He was 67.

Discography

Bibliography

References

Further reading

External links

 
 Phenix Horns official website

1937 births
2004 deaths
African-American guitarists
American funk bass guitarists
American male bass guitarists
American funk trombonists
American jazz bass guitarists
American jazz trombonists
Male trombonists
American rhythm and blues bass guitarists
American session musicians
African-American male singers
Earth, Wind & Fire members
People from Shaw, Mississippi
20th-century American bass guitarists
Jazz musicians from Mississippi
20th-century trombonists
American male jazz musicians
The Pharaohs members
20th-century American male singers
20th-century American singers